Marwan Chamaa (born in Beirut, Lebanon, 1964) is a painter, designer, and storyteller who spent most of his adult life in Germany, Lebanon, and the USA. He studied Art at the American University of Beirut, Beirut University College, and at the Corcoran School of Art. His art has been described as Middle Eastern Neo Pop-Art. He embodies the traits of a paparazzi, storyteller, and epicurean. Marwan has the spirit of a global citizen but never forgetting his Middle Eastern roots. Translating this gift in his art and lifestyle to bridge the gap, which is evident now more than ever, between the East and West.

Career
Chamaa was a founding member of the “X-ism” movement while in university. This  movement, which included a diverse array of ideologies, fashion styles and forms of expression, as well as visual arts, music, literature and film. The subculture is largely characterized by anti-establishment views of the academic structures in art and the promotion of individual freedom of expression. It was established in 1987 by four art students: Chamaa, Fadi Ghazzaoui, Abdallah Ghorayeb, and Haytham Jawhari.  It laid the groundwork for their current artistic identity.

From 1985 Chamaa has been painting using various forms, mediums, and techniques. In mid 2013, he had a solo show entitled "La Dolce Vita" at the Galerie Tanit, (Beirut, Lebanon). It was dubbed "Middle Eastern neo-pop art" by many critics. The exhibition comprised 12 paintings that flow from one canvas to the next to form a 21.60 meter (70 feet and 87 inches) mural. The collection is an illustrated narrative.

At the end of 2013 he showed "Caramels, superheroes, fried eggs et chocolats", a series comprising two (191 x 405 cm) triptych paintings and one (240 x 185 cm) diptych painting. This exhibition was shown at Bel-Air Fine Art Gallery in Geneva and Gstaad, Switzerland.

In 2015 Chamaa showed the series, “unplugged”. It is partly based on photographs that Carlos René Pérez took of New York City. Pérez was Chamaa's neighbor in the East Village of New York City where he spent many years of his adult life. The images chosen for this series from Pérez's collection speak intimately to Chamaa. They represent a snapshot of his old neighborhood and are a vignette of spots in and around the city he used to frequent.

In September 2015, Chamaa was chosen by Selections Magazine to be among 50 emerging Arab artists. He created "The Tarboush Chronicles" a series that reiterates the importance of staying true to one's original identity. A 20 cm x 20 cm canvas of the series was displayed in the 2015 Beirut Art Fair.

In November 2015 the series Ecstatic was exhibited, Chamaa again uses his surroundings as his muse as he sets forth two large paintings. Inspired by the likes of Vitaly Komar, Alex Melamid, Wang Guangyi, and Alexander Kosolapov who use communist propaganda symbols as a base to convey a message. However unlike those great artists Chamaa is not criticizing the communist drives but rather using the original propaganda posters of Chairman Mao Zedong the founding father of the People's Republic of China, as a backdrop to Lebanize his message.

In the Spring of 2016, “Chagrin d’amour – the musical” series was exhibited.  The mélange of the Occident and Orient, as is typical in Chamaa's works is evident in this series. Vintage Western comic book covers as well as vignettes from famous pieces by Roy Lichtenstein are wittingly woven with 1940's - 1960's Arabic love song lyrics. Chamaa's choice to incorporate Lichtenstein as a backdrop to this particular series is a natural selection as a tribute to the pop artist, who since the beginning of his career, used comic books as subject matter in various of his early paintings.

In July 2016, Mashrou3 Lulu (The Lulu Project) was presented. This series is about the adventures of Lulu Moppet, nicknamed Little Lulu, and her friend Thomas Tompkins, aka Tubby. The series is painted in the style reminiscent to the original “The Little Lulu” comic strip covers. The series comprises two installations, one triptych and two large format paintings. This work by Chamaa depicts a playful and innocent adventure of Little Lulu and Tubby, incorporating other characters like Hergé’s character Archibald Haddock and many hidden surprises.

In late 2016, when asked about the doodles that he has created in-between series, Chamaa replied: “In between projects and in the midst of creating and working on a series, I need to stretch my fingers, wrists, elbows, shoulders, and especially my mind from the detailed and intense work I invest in my artworks. The results are usually city scenes with many random strokes in terms of color, direction, and emotion; I call this routine: shama-sutra."

In September 2017 "It's a fake" was exhibited at the Beirut Art Fair from the series “Ana biddeh” (I want). Marwan Chamaa sets off to explore the idea of Arabicity and what that means in this day and age. The series “Ana biddeh” shows that the only unifying factor in Arab society is the appetite for global consumerism and greed resulting in the loss of its true identity.

In November 2018 Marwan had a solo exhibition at the Mark Hachem Gallery in Beirut Lebanon. “RETRO-PER-SPECTIVE” featured his various interpretations of pop culture through select pieces past and present.

In Spring 2020, Marwan Chamaa created Cin-Cin Comics. Cin-Cin Comics is a biannual tongue in cheek comics-cover-paintings . The first "issue" is number 35, the reason for not starting with number 1 is personal according to Mr. Chamaa. Cin-Cin Comics uses existing comics elements, topics, and characters as a base to satirically emphasize the cultural, political, and social landscape. Most illustrations are from the mid 50s America, giving the paintings a retro look. Cin-Cin Comics, not always politically correct, is a highly collectible series. Each painting is around 80 cm x 110 cm (31.50 x 43.30 inch), painted usually in acrylic paint.

Selected exhibitions

 L'Association Libano-Allemande pour la Promotion de la Culture, Beirut, Lebanon, January 1991
 Le Thé Art Café, Beirut, Lebanon, May 1991
 Galerie Tanit, Beirut, Lebanon, May 2013
 Beirut Art Fair, Beirut, Lebanon, September 2013
 Bel-Air Fine Art Gallery, Geneva, Switzerland, December 2013
 Bel-Air Fine Art Gallery Gstaad, Switzerland, December 2013
 Bel-Air Fine Art Gallery, St. Tropez, France, April 2014
 Galerie Des Lices, St. Tropez, France, May 2014
 Beirut Art Fair, Beirut, Lebanon, September 2014
 Bel-Air Fine Art Gallery, Geneva, Switzerland, February 2015
 Paddle 8, New York City, USA, May 2015
 Beirut Art Fair, Beirut, Lebanon, September 2015
 Opera Gallery, Dubai, United Arab Emirates, February 2016
 Opera Gallery, Dubai, United Arab Emirates, April 2016
 Tawlet, Beirut, Lebanon, June 2016
 Bagatelle, Dubai, United Arab Emirates, December 2016
 Mark Hachem Gallery, Beirut, Lebanon, February 2017
 Opera Gallery, Dubai, United Arab Emirates, April 2017
 Mark Hachem Gallery, Beirut, Lebanon, April 2017
 Mark Hachem Gallery, Beirut, Lebanon, August 2017
 Mark Hachem Gallery, Beirut, Lebanon, September 2017
 Beirut Art Fair, Beirut, Lebanon, September 2017
 Opera Gallery, Dubai, United Arab Emirates, October 2017
 Paddle 8, New York City, USA, October 2017
 Bagatelle, Dubai, United Arab Emirates, December 2017
 Mark Hachem Gallery, Beirut, Lebanon, December 2017
 Cultural Narratives by Selections, Dubai, United Arab Emirates, February 2018
 Mark Hachem Gallery, Beirut, Lebanon, April 2018
 Opera Gallery, Dubai, United Arab Emirates, May 2018
 Mark Hachem Gallery, Beirut, Lebanon, September 2018
 Borderless, Beirut, Lebanon, September 2018
 CAP, Cultural Narratives by Selections, Kuwait, October 2018
 Mark Hachem Gallery, Beirut, Lebanon, November 2018
 Mark Hachem Gallery, Beirut, Lebanon, February 2019
 72nd Festival de Cannes, Cannes, France, May 2019
 Mark Hachem Gallery, Beirut, Lebanon, June 2019
 Volta Art Fair 2019, Basel, Switzerland, June 2019
 Art Factory, Beirut, Lebanon, June 2019
 Electra Art Space, Athens, Greece, June 2019
 Skoufa Gallery, Mykonos, Greece, July 2019
 Rising Art Fair, Beirut, Lebanon, July 2019
 Art Athina, Athens, Greece, September 2019
 Beirut Art Fair, Beirut, Lebanon, September 2019
 Mark Hachem Gallery, Beirut, Lebanon, August 2019
 Mark Hachem Gallery, Beirut, Lebanon, December 2019
 Skoufa Gallery, Athens, Greece, December 2019
 Selections, "Glimpses" online, London, UK, June 2020
 Skoufa Gallery, Athens, Greece, July 2020
 Mark Hachem Gallery, online on Artsy, Paris France, August 2020
 Vivendi Gallery, Scope Art Fair online, Miami Beach, USA, September 2020
 Showfields, online, New York City, USA, September 2020
 Mark Hachem Gallery, Beirut, Lebanon, October 2020
 Mark Hachem Gallery, Beirut, Lebanon, December 2020
 Mark Hachem Gallery, Beirut, Lebanon, January 2021
 Selections Arts, Viewing Rooms "Portraiture in a contemporary world" online, Dubai, UAE, March 2021
 Selections Arts, "The emerging artist's show" online, Dubai, UAE, March 2021

References

External links
 
 https://www.youtube.com/channel/UCJhqY_EEk0s-LOCmhhNf2Fg
 https://www.youtube.com/watch?v=7APnxBojvj4&html5=1
 http://curve-magazine.com/article.php?issueId=68&catId=11&articleId=367#.U9ioxeOSx2A
 http://aishtiblog.com/marwan-chamaas-sweet-life/
 http://www.carlosreneperez.com/
 http://www.belairfineart.com/fr/artist/179/overview/
 http://www.galeriedeslices.com/en/artist/179/works/
 http://www.galerietanit.com/

Living people
1964 births
People from the East Village, Manhattan
American University of Beirut alumni
Corcoran School of the Arts and Design alumni
Lebanese artists
Pop artists